This is a list of the Sites of Special Scientific Interest (SSSIs) in the Newport Area of Search (AoS).

History
This Area of Search was formed from parts of the previous AoS of Gwent.

Sites 
 Gwent Levels
 Rumney
 St Brides
 Whitson
 Nash and Goldcliff
 Redwick
 Newport Wetlands
 Langstone-Llanmartin Meadows
 Parc Seymour Woods
 Penhow Woodlands
 Plas Machen Wood
 River Usk - Lower Usk
 Severn Estuary

See also
 List of SSSIs by Area of Search

References

Geography of Newport, Wales
Newport
Newport